Lawrence Patrick David Gillick (born August 22, 1937) is an American professional baseball executive. He previously served as the general manager of four MLB teams: the Toronto Blue Jays (1978–1994), Baltimore Orioles (1996–1998), Seattle Mariners (2000–2003), and Philadelphia Phillies (2006–2008). He guided the Blue Jays to World Series championships in 1992 and 1993, and later with the Phillies in 2008.

He won a national championship in college while pitching for the University of Southern California (USC). Gillick was inducted into the Canadian Baseball Hall of Fame in 1997, the National Baseball Hall of Fame on July 24, 2011, the Ontario Sports Hall of Fame in 2013, and the Phillies Wall of Fame in 2018.

Early life
Gillick was born to former minor league baseball player Larry Gillick in Chico, California. In 1951, he earned his Eagle Scout from the Boy Scouts of America. He continued to stay involved in Scouting and received the Order of the Arrow's Vigil Honor mere months after winning the College World Series at USC. After graduating from Notre Dame High School in Sherman Oaks, California, he hitchhiked to Vulcan, Alberta, to toil as a kid pitcher with the semi-pro Vulcan Elks of the Foothills-Wheatbelt League. Gillick had to wire his grandmother for $25 to finance his last leg from Montana to Vulcan.

He attended USC and joined the Delta Chi Fraternity. He graduated in 1958 with a degree in business. He was also a gifted pitcher, playing on the 1958 National Title baseball team at USC and spending five years in the minor league systems of the Baltimore Orioles and Pittsburgh Pirates, venturing as high as Triple-A. A left-hander, Gillick posted a win–loss record of 45–32 with an earned run average of 3.42 in 164 minor league games.

Front office career

Gillick retired from playing and began a front-office career in 1963, when he became the assistant farm director with the Houston Colt .45s. He would eventually work his way up to the position of Director of Scouting before moving to the New York Yankees system in 1974, as a Coordinator of Player Development. In 1976, he moved, this time to the expansion Toronto Blue Jays, becoming their Vice-president of Player Personnel, and in 1977, their Vice-president of Baseball Operations and General Manager. In 1984, he was named Executive Vice-president of Baseball Operations.

As Toronto's general manager, Gillick won five division titles (1985, 1989, 1991, 1992 and 1993) and led the club to their first World Series championships in 1992 and 1993. Shortly after Gillick resigned in 1994, the Blue Jays went into decline, not finishing higher than third place until 2006, and failing to make the playoffs until 2015.

In 1995, Gillick was named the general manager of the Baltimore Orioles to replace Roland Hemond, who had resigned. He cited the fact that they were close to winning a championship as a factor to his decision to come out of retirement. He guided the Orioles to the playoffs in 1996 and 1997. He announced on September 20, 1998 his departure from the Orioles when his three-year contract expired after the conclusion of the season. The Orioles struggled shortly after his departure, failing to achieve a winning season until 2012.

Gillick then became the general manager of the Seattle Mariners, who had parlayed their incredible 1995 playoff run into a new ballpark and the financial resources to become a perennial contender. Upon his hiring, the responsibility fell on Gillick to trade Ken Griffey Jr. to Cincinnati after Griffey played out his final season in Seattle. The Mariners made back-to-back playoff appearances for the only time in franchise history in 2000 and 2001, and the 2001 team, with a 116–46 record, tied the 1906 Chicago Cubs for the all-time Major League Baseball record for most wins in a single season. However, the Mariners failed to make it past the American League Championship Series in either year, and did not make the playoffs for the rest of Gillick's tenure as GM and advisor. Following his departure, the Mariners would not reach the playoffs again until 2022.

On November 2, 2005, Gillick was named the Philadelphia Phillies' general manager, after which his first big move was to trade Jim Thome and cash to the Chicago White Sox for Aaron Rowand along with prospects Gio González and Daniel Haigwood, being a move which cleared the way for Phillies' Rookie of the Year Ryan Howard to become the permanent starter. Howard would be named NL MVP that year.

Gillick had permanent residence in Toronto with his wife Doris, however they have since relocated to Seattle after he became the Phillies GM. He had become a Canadian citizen in 2004.

Gillick retired from his position as general manager after leading the Phillies to a World Series championship in 2008. Assistant general manager Rubén Amaro Jr. was named his successor. Gillick remained in the organization as a senior advisor to Amaro and Phillies president David Montgomery. In August 2014, Gillick became interim president of the Phillies while Montgomery was on medical leave.  In January 2015, Montgomery returned but became Phillies chairman, while Gillick assumed the club presidency on a permanent basis. Gillick returned to his senior advisor role after the Phillies promoted Andy MacPhail to president, who first joined the Phillies organization as a special assistant to Gillick during the 2015 season.

Since 2016, Gillick served as part-owner of teams in the collegiate woodbat Great West League such as the Chico Heat and Yuba-Sutter Gold Sox.  He won championships with the Heat in the league's inaugural season in 2016 and their final season in 2018.

Honors and awards
In 1993, Sporting News awarded its Sportsman of the Year honor to Gillick and Blue Jays manager Cito Gaston.
In 1997, Gillick was inducted into the Canadian Baseball Hall of Fame.
In 2002, Gillick was inducted into the Toronto Blue Jays' Level of Excellence
In 2008, baseball fans nationwide voted him the MLB "This Year in Baseball Awards" Executive of the Year.
Also in 2008, he was named "King of Baseball", a ceremonial title awarded by Minor League Baseball to one person each year in recognition of longtime dedication and service to professional baseball.
In December 2009, Sports Illustrated named him as number 7 on its list of the Top 10 GMs/Executives of the Decade (in all sports).
On December 6, 2010, Gillick was elected to the National Baseball Hall of Fame by the new Expansion Era Committee which considers Expansion Era candidates identified from the Expansion Era, 1973–present. He was the fourth general manager ever enshrined. He was formally inducted on July 24, 2011, with former major league players, Roberto Alomar and Bert Blyleven.
In 2015 he received the Distinguished Eagle Scout Award from the Boy Scouts of America
In 2018, Gillick became the first executive inducted into the Philadelphia Baseball Wall of Fame

References

External links

Alumni report from USC

1937 births
Living people
American expatriate baseball people in Canada
Baltimore Orioles executives
Baseball players from California
Canadian Baseball Hall of Fame inductees
Columbus Jets players
Elmira Pioneers players
Fox Cities Foxes players
Houston Astros executives
Houston Astros scouts
Little Rock Travelers players
Los Angeles Valley Monarchs baseball players
Marshall School of Business alumni
Major League Baseball general managers
Major League Baseball scouting directors
Minor league baseball players
National Baseball Hall of Fame inductees
New York Yankees executives
Philadelphia Phillies executives
Rapiños de Occidente players
Rochester Red Wings players
Seattle Mariners executives
Sportspeople from Chico, California
Sportspeople from Toronto
Stockton Ports players
Toronto Blue Jays executives
USC Trojans baseball players
Vancouver Mounties players